Clwb Rygbi Cwmgors is a rugby union club that represents the villages of Cwmgors, Gwaun-Cae-Gurwen and Tairgwaith, South West Wales. Cwmgors RFC is a member of the Welsh Rugby Union and is a feeder club for the Ospreys.

Curwen Stars
Although Cwmgors RFC did not come into existence until 1927 rugby had been played in the town from 1895. A team called the All Blacks was formed in the town in 1895, this team would later change its name to the Curwen Stars. The Curwen Stars joined the Llanelli and District Rugby Union in 1900, and eventually joined the Welsh Rugby Union in 1913. In 1923 a second team formed in the village, made up from members of the Cwmgors Colliery called the 'Mond' team, named after the owner of the colliery Alfred Mond. The 'Mond' boasts future Welsh captain Claude Davey as one of its players. In 1927 both the Curwen Stars and the Mond disbanded and severed all union connections. In that year a new team then emerged called Cwmgors RFC which joined the Swansea and District Rugby Union.

1930s–1990
In 1938 Cwmgors RFC collected their first notable trophy when they won the Swansea and District Challenge Cup and that year gained membership of the WRU. In 1950 the club changed their home ground from Parc Howard to Parc y Werin, also changing their headquarters from the on public house, the New Star Hotel, to another, the Caegurwen Arms.

Club honours
1st XV
Swansea and District Challenge Cup 1938 – Winners
West Wales RFU Challenge Cup – Winners
West Wales Cup 1969/70 – Winners
West Wales RU Section E 1987/88 – Winners
West Wales RU Section C 1993/94 – Winners
WRU League 7B West 1995/96 – Champions
WRU Division Six West 2002/03 – Champions
WRU Division Four South West 2003/04 – Champions
WRU Tovali Bowl Winners 2003/4

2nd XV
Swansea and District RU Section D Winners 1980/1
Swansea and District RU Merit Table Winners 2005/6

Youth XV
Amman Valley Youth RU League Winners 1968
Amman Valley Youth RU Cup Winners 1968
Ospreys Central Youth League Winners 2018/19

Notable former players
 Claude Davey (23 caps) (as part of the 'Mond' colliery team)
 Will Davies (4 caps) (as part of the 'Mond' colliery team)
 Gareth Edwards (53 caps)
 Emrys Evans (3 caps) 
 Denzil Thomas (1 cap)

References

Rugby clubs established in 1927
Welsh rugby union teams
Rugby union in Neath Port Talbot